Cecidochares frauenfeldi is a species of tephritid or fruit flies in the genus Cecidochares of the family Tephritidae.

Distribution
Brazil.

References

Tephritinae
Insects described in 1868
Diptera of South America